Victor Humphrey Stollmeyer (24 January 1916 – 21 September 1999) was a West Indian cricketer who played in one Test in 1939.

Vic Stollmeyer was the older brother of West Indian captain Jeff Stollmeyer.

References

1916 births
1999 deaths
West Indies Test cricketers
Trinidad and Tobago cricketers